Dashak (also Romanized as Dāshak) is a village in Qorqori Rural District, Qorqori District, Hirmand County, Sistan and Baluchestan Province, Iran. At the 2006 census, its population was 301, in 51 families.

References 

Populated places in Hirmand County